Louis S. Glanzman (February 8, 1922 – July 7, 2013), was an American artist and book illustrator, probably best known as the illustrator of the first English language translations of the Pippi Longstocking books, in 1950.

Glanzman was born in Baltimore, Maryland and grew up in Virginia. His brother is fellow artist Sam Glanzman. He trained at the School of Industrial Arts in New York City.

He died on July 7, 2013.

References

1922 births
2013 deaths
American children's book illustrators
American comics artists
American magazine illustrators
Jewish American artists
20th-century American artists
Artists from Baltimore
21st-century American Jews